Friedrich Ehrendorfer (born 26 July 1927 in Vienna) is a professor emeritus of plant systematics at the Department of Botany and Biodiversity Research, University of Vienna. He is an honorary member of the American Academy of Arts and Sciences. For several years, he co-authored one of the leading university text-books in botany (Strasburger).

References

Botanists active in Europe
Scientists from Vienna
1927 births
Living people